The Exhibition Hall of the Ministry of Culture is an important government building in Ashgabat, Turkmenistan. It is operated by the Turkmen Ministry of Culture and regularly hosts displays including exhibitions, conferences and theatrical and drama performances in the arts. The three floors building was erected in 2005, by French company Bouygues.

Buildings and structures in Ashgabat
Government buildings completed in 2008